Luge at the 1998 Winter Olympics consisted of three events at Spiral.  The competition took place between 8 and 11 February 1998.

Medal summary

Medal table

Germany led the medal table, with five medals, including a sweep of the gold medals. The two medals for the United States, both in the doubles event, were the first won by a country outside of Europe or the Soviet Union.

Events

Participating NOCs
Twenty-four nations participated in Luge at the Nagano Games. India, South Korea, New Zealand and Venezuela made their Olympic luge debuts.

References

 
1998
1998 Winter Olympics events
1998 in luge